SuperBike was a monthly British motorcycling magazine. In addition to motorcycles, the magazine featured reviews of race bikes, dirt bikes, and others. It is now a completely digital motorcycle media platform, serving content to around half a million bikers a week.

Features
The magazine generally featured a mix of bike and product tests, some technical features, long term test bike reports as well as race features from WSB, BSB and MotoGP racing.

SuperBike featured a centerfold photograph of a topless lady with a motorcycle. This feature was discontinued in the May 2009 issue.

Spinoff television show
In January 2013, the British Loaded TV network started The Superbike Show.

Change of owner
In September 2013, the magazine was taken over by Blaze Publishing of Leamington Spa, England. SuperBike is now owned by G10 Media Ltd, after the former editor bought SuperBike from Blaze Publishing.

Closure
The January 2015 issue was noted as the final printed issue of SuperBike magazine UK after 38 years on the shelves.

References

External links
 

1977 establishments in the United Kingdom
2015 disestablishments in the United Kingdom
Monthly magazines published in the United Kingdom
Motorcycle magazines published in the United Kingdom
Defunct magazines published in the United Kingdom
Magazines established in 1977
Magazines disestablished in 2015